Hungarian Union was a political coalition in the legislative elections in Serbia, on 21 January, 2007. The alliance won 0.32% of the popular vote, and no seats in the parliament. The alliance was formed by the Democratic Fellowship of Vojvodina Hungarians led by Sándor Páll and Democratic Party of Vojvodina Hungarians led by András Ágoston.

References 

Defunct political party alliances in Serbia
Politics of Vojvodina
Hungarian political parties in Serbia
2007 establishments in Serbia